Marchitecture (or Marketecture) is a portmanteau of the words marketing and architecture. It is a good way for companies to 'show off' what technological advances they have accomplished. The term is applied to any form of electronic architecture, online programs used to 3D model designs, perceived to have been produced purely for marketing reasons. It may be used by a vendor to place itself in such a way as to promote all their strongest abilities whilst simultaneously masking their weaknesses.

The term Marketecture is also used in the context of an abstract description of a complex system, such as a distributed software system, for the purpose of discussion and analysis. In his book Essential Software Architecture, Ian Gorton describes it as 

[A marketecture] is one page, typically informal depiction of the system's structure and interactions. It shows the major components, their relationships and has a few well chosen labels and text boxes that portray the design philosophies embodied in the architecture. A marketecture is an excellent vehicle for facilitating discussion by stakeholders during design, build, review, and of course the sales process. It's easy to understand and explain, and serves as a starting point for deeper analysis.

The Ford motor company uses 3D models and designs for marketing. In an article about the Ford F-150 the company shows a model of the air flow blowing against the car, proving how aerodynamic it is. They make a very good point to express this idea so people do not focus on the negative aspects the truck has.

References

External links
 Marketecture definition from Word Spy
 Software Architecture: The Difference between Marketecture and Tarchitecture (sample chapter) from Beyond Software Architecture: Creating and Sustaining Winning Solutions by Luke Hohmann
 Essential Software Architecture by Ian Gorton
 Dilbert cartoon from March 2, 2009 has "marketecture" as central topic
 Architecture Marchitecture
 Ford Article

Technology neologisms
Promotion and marketing communications
Software architecture